Robert Andrew Peterson (June 16, 1884November 27, 1962) was a utility player in Major League Baseball, playing mainly as a catcher for the Boston Americans from 1906 through 1907. He was born in Philadelphia, Pennsylvania.

In a two-season career, Peterson was a .191 hitter (25-for-131) with two home runs and nine RBI in 43 games, including 11 runs, one double, one triple, and one stolen base. He made 40 appearances as a catcher (34), second baseman (3), first baseman (2) and left fielder (1).

Peterson died in Evesham Township, New Jersey on

See also
1906 Boston Americans season
1907 Boston Americans season

External links

Retrosheet

1884 births
1962 deaths
Baseball players from Philadelphia
Major League Baseball catchers
Boston Americans players
Fall River Indians players
Providence Grays (minor league) players
Scranton Miners players
Binghamton Bingoes players